Gustavo Hernan Ortiz (born October 10, 1977 in Almirante Brown Partido, Buenos Aires) is an Argentine footballer that currently plays for Persibo Bojonegoro in the Indonesia Premier League.

References

External links

1977 births
Association football midfielders
Argentine expatriate footballers
Argentine expatriate sportspeople in Indonesia
Argentine footballers
Expatriate footballers in Indonesia
Liga 1 (Indonesia) players
Living people
People from Almirante Brown Partido
Footballers from Buenos Aires
Persija Jakarta players
Persibo Bojonegoro players
PSIS Semarang players
Persisam Putra Samarinda players